Winnie-the-Pooh: Blood and Honey is a 2023 British independent slasher film written, directed and produced by Rhys Frake-Waterfield. The film serves as a horror retelling of A. A. Milne and E. H. Shepard's Winnie-the-Pooh books and stars Craig David Dowsett as Winnie-the-Pooh and Chris Cordell as Piglet, with Amber Doig-Thorne, Nikolai Leon, Maria Taylor, Natasha Rose Mills and Danielle Ronald in supporting roles. It follows Pooh and Piglet, who have now become feral and bloodthirsty murderers, as they terrorise a group of young university women and an adult Christopher Robin when he returns to the Hundred Acre Wood many years later after leaving for college.

The film was first announced on 24 May 2022, where it drew widespread attention due to its premise involving a character that garnered a reputation as a "beloved childhood icon" and was met with divided reactions. It was produced by Jagged Edge Productions in association with ITN Studios, and went into development after the 1926 Winnie-the-Pooh book entered the public domain in the United States on 1 January 2022. On a budget under $100,000, a ten-day shoot for the film took place in the Ashdown Forest of East Sussex, England, which serves as inspiration for the Hundred Acre Wood, the setting for the stories.

Originally set for a nationwide one-night event, a spike in online popularity had it expanded to a major worldwide theatrical release. Winnie-the-Pooh: Blood and Honey premiered in Mexico on 26 January 2023, and was theatrically released in the United States on 15 February 2023, and in the United Kingdom on 10 March 2023. The film has received negative reviews from critics for its low budget and production values, as well as a lack of a coherent story and creativity. It has grossed over $4 million worldwide.

Plot 

Many years ago, a young Christopher Robin befriended a group of anthropomorphic creatures – Winnie-the-Pooh, Piglet, Eeyore, Rabbit and Owl – in the Hundred Acre Wood. However, when Christopher entered college, he stopped visiting. Without Christopher to feed them or give them guidance, and with the arrival of winter, Pooh, Piglet, Rabbit, and Owl went into extreme starvation and resorted to killing and eating Eeyore, which traumatised the group to the point where they developed a hatred for humanity, as well as Christopher for abandoning them. The group made a pact to abandon their humanity and return to their feral instincts, vowing never to speak again in the process.

Five years later, Christopher, now an adult, returns to the Hundred Acre Wood, accompanied by his fiancée, Mary, to reunite with his old friends, but finds the place in a desolate state. Despite Mary's warnings to leave, Christopher investigates further and is surprised by Piglet, who strangles Mary to death with a chain. Horrified, Christopher tries to run, but is cornered by Pooh and Piglet, who drag him back into the woods.

Sometime later, a group of university students – Maria, Jess, Alice, Zoe, and Lara – rent a cabin in the Hundred Acre Wood at the suggestion of Maria's therapist, so she can move on from a traumatic stalking experience. Tina, another of Maria's friends, gets lost on the way to the cabin and is chased by Pooh into an abandoned factory, where he grinds her up with a woodchipper. Later, in Pooh's treehouse, Christopher has been held prisoner by Pooh, who brutally whips him with Eeyore's tail. Christopher sees Mary's corpse in the corner of the room, and Pooh showers him in her blood.

As night falls, Pooh and Piglet discover the cabin and kidnap Lara, who is relaxing in a hot tub until Pooh and Piglet seize her from behind. Piglet pins her down while Pooh slowly drives a car into Lara's head, crushing her skull. Having heard the commotion, Maria and Jess go outside to investigate, only to find Lara's corpse, running back to the cabin to warn Alice and Zoe. The girls are attacked by Pooh and are separated. Piglet enters, knocking Alice unconscious, and kills Zoe with a sledgehammer. Maria and Jess watch as Pooh and Piglet take Alice and decide to follow them into the woods to rescue her.

In Pooh's treehouse, Maria and Jess free Alice, Christopher, and another hostage named Charlene, whose husband Scott has already been murdered by Piglet. Seeking revenge, Charlene summons Piglet to kill him, but Pooh subdues her and Piglet mauls her to death. Pooh chases Maria and Jess into the woods while Alice stays behind to bludgeon an unsuspecting Piglet with his own sledgehammer. Hearing Piglet scream, Pooh runs back to the treehouse, but finds him already dead. Enraged, Pooh confronts Alice with a knife and proceeds to fatally impale her to a wall through her open mouth.

Maria and Jess run to the road, where they stop a car driven by four local men – Logan, Tucker, John, and Colt – to ask for help. Despite the men's attempts to take him down, Pooh easily kills them one by one until Maria tries to run him over with the car. Pooh climbs into the car and Maria crashes into a tree, losing consciousness. When she wakes, she witnesses Pooh decapitating Jess. Pooh attempts to kill Maria until Christopher appears driving another car, seemingly crushing him to death between the two cars.

Christopher tries to help Maria, but Pooh, having survived, catches up and grabs Maria, holding her at knifepoint. Christopher pleads with Pooh to spare her, and vows to spend the rest of his life in the Hundred Acre Wood with him. Pooh slowly lowers his knife at first, but then he says, "You left" (breaking his vow of silence) and slashes Maria's throat. Realizing that his former friend is now beyond help, Christopher flees the wood, while Pooh repeatedly stabs Maria's corpse.

Cast

Production

Development

On 27 May 2022, entertainment website IGN reported that a Winnie-the-Pooh-based horror film adaptation was in development. The characters' rights had been owned by The Walt Disney Company since 1966 and, while Disney retains exclusive rights to the depictions of these characters from their own franchise, the first Winnie-the-Pooh book went into the public domain in the US on 1 January 2022. After the copyright lapsed, Rhys Frake-Waterfield began development on Winnie-the-Pooh: Blood and Honey the same year, with the film marking his directorial debut. Speaking to Variety, Frake-Waterfield described the plot as both Winnie-the-Pooh and Piglet turning into homicidal maniacs after Christopher Robin leaves them for college. He stated: The masks used for Pooh and Piglet in the film were created by the American prosthetic-mask manufacturing company Immortal Masks, which actually did the Winnie-the-Pooh-styled masks before the 1926 book entered the public domain.

Filming

Principal photography for Winnie-the-Pooh: Blood and Honey began in April 2022, with filming taking place in the Ashdown Forest of East Sussex, England over a period of ten days. Jagged Edge Productions produced the film in collaboration with ITN Studios. Frake-Waterfield was careful to avoid Pooh's iconic red shirt, as well as any other elements from Disney's depictions that could pose a copyright issue.

After the increased popularity of the film, ITN gave the film an increased budget, leading to several days of reshoots. This would lead to the film being the most expensive film Waterfield ever directed and the most expensive film produced by ITN, with a budget of under $100,000.

Music
In July 2022, American composer Andrew Scott Bell was announced as a provider for the score. On 14 July 2022, Bell uploaded a video to YouTube titled "Winnie-the-Pooh: Blood, Honey, and Violins" that documented how he drove from Los Angeles to San Francisco, with his manager Mike Rosen, to collect a honeycomb-filled violin from an experimental luthier to compose the film's soundtrack. In an interview with Dread Central, Bell explains how he got involved with the production of Winnie-the-Pooh: Blood and Honey upon hearing about the film after it went viral upon the announcement. He said:Back in late May, a day or so before the film went massively viral, I started seeing some online chatter about a Winnie the Pooh horror movie. I remember looking it up on IMDb and finding the director Rhys Frake-Waterfield on Instagram where his story had a screenshot of a person's comment saying something to the effect of "your movie is ruining our childhoods". His reaction was, "that's what I'm trying to do, ruin everyone's childhood".

Release
Winnie-the-Pooh: Blood and Honey was originally planned to be released in October 2022, but the increased publicity and reshoots motivated the change to a 2023 cinema release. The film premiered in Mexico on 26 January 2023 and was released by Cinemex. It was originally set to be released for a one-day event across cinemas in the United States, United Kingdom and Canada on 15 February 2023, with Fathom Events and Altitude Film Distribution acquiring the rights to release it in their respective countries. In January 2023, it was announced that the film had been given an expanded cinema release starting on 15 February in the United States. The film was then released in the United Kingdom on 10 March 2023. For one week the film will be re-released in cinemas in the United States on 17 March 2023.

Marketing
After the film's announcement, Salon writer Kelly McClure wrote the film is "a perfect example of the wrong that could come from a creative work slipping into public domain." She continued, calling the film a "horrific take" on Winnie-the-Pooh, also stating "you've got the makings of a dark and twisted cult classic." Jon Mendelsohn, writing for Collider, called the film images "nightmare fuel" and the concept "extremely bizarre" while noting "the internet is freaking out." Rotem Rusak, writing for Nerdist, wrote, "Seeing the iconic bear reimagined as a nightmarish slasher monster speaks to a delightfully imaginative spirit that really inspires us." Justin Carter of Gizmodo wrote:

Katarina Feder of Artnet wrote, "...you can't buy publicity like the kind they've had and something tells me that this indie passion project will find its funding, bringing to life the director's unique ideas about murdering women in bikinis."

Reception

Box office 
, Winnie-The-Pooh: Blood and Honey has grossed $1.8 million in the United States and Canada, and $2.4 million in other territories, including over $1 million in Mexico, for a worldwide total of $4.2 million.

Critical response
 

Christian Zilko of IndieWire scored the film a grade C+, criticising the film's screenplay as an incoherent mess as well as the film's low production values. Awarding the film a similar score, Luke Thompson of the AV Club offered similar criticism towards the cheap production values and lack of a coherent story, while also noting that the film fulfills its promise of a slasher film based on a beloved children's book. Polygons Tasha Robinson felt that certain elements such as the gore and inherent grotesqueness of the material worked well, but added that the film's poor dialogue, lack of humour, and connection to its basic source material ruined an interesting premise.

Dennis Harvey of Variety was highly critical of the film for its lack of humour, poor acting, and incoherent screenplay, summarising that the film "fail[ed] to meet even the most basic expectations set up by its conceptual gimmick". In his review for Rue Morgue, Michael Gingold felt that the film lacked any sort of wit or imagination to successfully implement upon its premise; Gingold additionally pointed out the "drab" cinematography, absence of characterisation for its title villain, and messy production only served to make the film easily forgettable. Rating the film 1.5 out of 4 stars, Nick Allen from RogerEbert.com wrote that it failed as both a comedy and a horror film, noting the poorly lit scenes in the film made it hard to decipher what was happening on screen, while echoing other critics' sentiments on the writing and lack of interesting characters.

Future

In June 2022, Frake-Waterfield expressed interest in creating a sequel, and wants to "ramp it up even more and go even crazier and go even more extreme." In November 2022, he announced that a sequel was in development with Frake-Waterfield returning as director and writer, on a budget "five times" larger than the previous instalment. The production is anticipated to meet a February 2024 release.

Alongside the announcement of a sequel, two other horror films were announced: Bambi: The Reckoning and Peter Pan's Neverland Nightmare, based on Bambi, a Life in the Woods and Peter Pan, respectively. In February 2023, Frake-Waterfield announced that the various projects take place in the same shared continuity franchise, while Jagged Edge Productions intends to eventually have crossovers featuring the characters. Frake-Waterfield also expressed interest in making films about Thor, the Norse god of thunder, as well as copyrighted franchises such as Teletubbies and Teenage Mutant Ninja Turtles.

See also 
 The Banana Splits Movie, a horror film adapted from a children's franchise
 The Mean One, a similar horror film adapted from a children's franchise
 Arthur, malédiction, another horror film adapted from a children's franchise

References

External links
 
 

2023 films
2023 horror films
2023 independent films
British independent films
British satirical films
Dark fantasy films
Films shot in East Sussex
Films shot in England
Winnie-the-Pooh films
Horror films based on children's franchises
British exploitation films
2020s English-language films
Films about bears
Obscenity controversies in film
Film controversies
Films about pigs